Duqiao railway station is a railway station in Linhai, Taizhou, Zhejiang, China. It is an intermediate stop on the Jinhua–Taizhou railway and was opened on 25 June 2021. The service level is one train each way per day. There is one platform and two additional lines running through the station without platforms.

References 

Railway stations in Zhejiang
Railway stations in China opened in 2021